Building The Colossus (1994) is the eighth album by American singer-songwriter Happy Rhodes.

Track listing

All music, lyrics, voices, instruments and arrangements - Happy Rhodes (except as noted in credits)

 "Hold Me" - 4:40
 "Just Like Tivoli" - 6:04
 "Dying" - 5:44
 "Collective Heart" - 4:43
 "Building the Colossus" - 4:18
 "Omar" - 4:47
 "Pride" - 2:39
 "You Never Told Me" - 5:03
 "If I Ever See the Girl  Again" - 5:33
 "Down, Down" - 6:15
 "Big Dreams, Big Life" - 2:31
 "Glory" - 6:00

Produced by Happy Rhodes and Kevin Bartlett
Engineered by Pat Tessitore at Cathedral Sound Studios, Rensselaer, NY

Personnel
Happy Rhodes:
Vocals,  Electronic Percussion, Keyboards, Nylon String Guitar, 12-String Guitar:, Acoustic Guitar, Synth Organ
Kevin Bartlett:
Electric Guitar, E-Bow Guitar, 12-String Guitar, 6-Strong Guitar, Nukelele Island Guitar, Acoustic Guitar, Electronic Percussion, Bass, Electric Bass, Synth Bass, Wacka-Wacka, Keyboards
David Torn:
Electronic Guitar, Electric Guitar, Seismic Anomalic Electric Guitar, Loops, Subliminal Guitar Loop,
Jerry Marotta:
Drums, Toms, Percussion
Dave Sepowski: 
Electric Guitar
Chuck D'Aloia:
Slide Guitars, Nylon String Guitar
Peter Sheehan:
Additional Percussion
Monica Wilson:
Cello

Chatter in "Glory" by: Happy Rhodes, Kelly Bird, Karen Campbell, Rachael Cooper, Theresa Burns Parkhurst, Amy Abdou, Abba Rage

1994 albums
Happy Rhodes albums